The Diamond Film is a film award recognising domestic box office achievements in the Netherlands. The Diamond Film is awarded to films from the Netherlands once they have sold 1,000,000 cinema tickets or more during the original circulation. The award is initiated by the Netherlands Film Festival and the Netherlands Film Fund in addition to the Golden Film for 100,000 visitors, the Platinum Film for 400,000 visitors, and the Crystal Film for 10,000 visitors of a documentary film.

History

The first Diamond Film was awarded to Black Book (2006) on 31 January 2007. The director of the Netherlands Film Festival presented the trophies to the producer San Fu Maltha, director Paul Verhoeven, and the film cast, during a dinner for the film crew and cast organized by San Fu Maltha. Black Book was the first film since the introduction of Dutch box office awards in 2001 that reached an audience of one million visitors. Black Book had a budget of €17,000,000, which made it the most expensive film from the Netherlands ever, at the time of its release. After receiving the Diamond Film, Paul Verhoeven says about Black Book:  Scenario writer Gerard Soeteman says about Black Book after it received the Diamond Film:

Films that received the Diamond Film

Other Dutch films with more than one million admissions
Between 1945 and 2013, the following Dutch films had admissions of greater than one million. In 2014, Gooische Vrouwen 2 had more than 2 million admissions.

Notes and references

External links
 Diamond Films

Dutch film awards
Film box office